"We Should Be Together" is a Christmas-themed song by Cliff Richard. Released as a single in November 1991 in the UK, the song was considered a contender for the Christmas number one spot but peaked at number 10.

The song differed from Richard's previous Christmas efforts—primarily being a love song.  The promotional video for the single depicts an offshore oil worker who makes the journey back to his home to join his family for Christmas. In the song, at around 3 minutes and 44 seconds, the solo trumpet quotes the second theme from the second movement of Dvořák's New World Symphony. This quote bears significance to the song, as Dvořák wrote this symphony when he was missing his home.

Chart performance

References

1991 singles
Cliff Richard songs
UK Singles Chart number-one singles
Songs written by Bruce Roberts (singer)
1991 songs